The Chief of Staff of the Prime Minister of Malta, officially called Head of Secretariat of the Office of the Prime Minister of the Republic of Malta, is the most senior political appointee in the Office of the Prime Minister of Malta. The chief of staff is appointed by the prime minister as its senior aid. This position acts as the principal advisor to the prime minister and it coordinates the work action of the different departments of the government.

History

Richard Cachia Caruana occupied the position under Eddie Fenech Adami until his appointment as Permanent Representative of Malta to the European Union. It was worth mentioning that a notorious attempt at assassinating Cachia Caruana was carried out in 1994 when he was stabbed close to his home in Mdina.

The chief of staff to Lawrence Gonzi, Edgar Galea Curmi, was asked to resign by then Leader of the Opposition (Malta), Joseph Muscat, after calling the police commissioner regarding a case involving Cyrus Engerer's father which was feared to be politically motivated. Lawrence Gonzi reiterated that the Galea Curmi did the right thing to ensure that the case was not politically motivated. Galea Curmi was later on claimed to have been earning over the pay grade at the time.

Upon his election as prime minister, Joseph Muscat made Keith Schembri his chief of staff. He was put under scrutiny for originating from a business background. Keith Schembri was reconfirmed as chief of staff further to the 2017 Maltese general election.

Schembri resigned on November 26, 2019. On the same day, his deputy Mark Farrugia was made chief of staff.

Further to Robert Abela's swearing in, economist Clyde Caruana was selected as chief of staff. Upon being co-opted to parliament, Clyde Caruana confirmed that he would keep the post of chief of staff. On November 21, 2020, a cabinet reshuffle was announced by the Prime Minister, handing Clyde Caruana the role of minister of finance and employment. Eventually, newsportal Lovin Malta rumoured that Glenn Micallef, a European Union policy advisor to the prime minister, was to replace Clyde Caruana.

List of chiefs of staff

References

Government of Malta